An Interest Project was an earned award for the Cadette and Senior levels of Girl Scouts of the USA. In the Fall of 2011, a new program was introduced and Interest Projects were retired.   
They were earned through completing skill-building activities and certain requirements.  Each Interest Project comes as a patch or badge and each represent an achievement in a different area such as camping or first aid. The badges are sewn onto the bottom left and right sections of the vest and the lower half of the sash uniform parts.

List of Badges
'Items marked by * are not pictured'
 A World of Understanding
 All About Birds
 American Patriotism
 Architecture & Environmental Design
 Artistic Crafts
 Backpacking
 Build a Better Future
 B Xtreme! *
 Camping
 Car Sense
 Child Care
 Collecting
 Computers in Everyday Life
 Conflict Resolution
 Cookies & Dough
 Couch Potato *
 Creative Cooking
 Desktop Publishing
 Digging Through The Past
 Do You Get The Message
 Dollars and Sense
 Eco-Action
 Emergency Preparedness
 Exploring the Net
 Family Living
 Fashion Design & Crafting
 Folk Arts
 The Food Connection
 From A to V: Audiovisual Production
 From Fitness to Fashion
 From Shore to Sea
 From Stress to Success
 Games for Life
 Generations Hand in Hand
 Global Girls *
 G.O. Girl! *
 Graphic Communications
 Heritage Hunt
 High Adventure
 Hi-tech Hide & Seek *
 Home Improvement
 Horse Sense
 In the Pink *
 Inventions and Inquiry
 Invitation to the Dance
 It's About Time
 Just Jewelry
 Law and Order
 Leadership
 The Lure of Language
 Math, Maps, and More
 Media Savvy
 Museum Discovery
 On a High Note
 On the Courts
 On the Playing Field
 On Your Own *
 Once Upon a Story
 Orienteering
 Outdoor Survival
 Paddle, Pole, and Roll
 Paper Works
 The Performing Arts
 Pets
 Photography
 Planet Power
 Plant Life
 The Play's the Thing
 Public Relations
 Reading
 Rolling Along
 Sew Glam *
 Smooth Sailing
 Space Exploration
 Sports for Life
 Textile Arts
 Travel
 Uncovering the Evidence *
 Understanding Yourself and Others
 Visual Arts
 Water Sports
 Why in the World?
 Wildlife
 Women through Time
 Women's Health
 Writing for Real
 Your Best Defense
 Your Own Business

See also

Membership levels of the Girl Scouts of the USA
Studio 2B

References

External links
GSUSA Official Website
Insignia List 

Girl Scouts of the USA